Conneaut High School is a public high school in Conneaut, Ohio in the United States. It is the only high school in the Conneaut Area City Schools district which is located in the northeasternmost corner of Ohio. The Conneaut High School mascot is the Spartan. Conneaut High School is in the Northeastern Conference and is classified as a Division-2 school for most sports. Ohio athletic state championships. ( 2000 OHSAA D2 state champions: girls softball. 2019 Ohsaa state champion track and field boys 200 meter dash: Matt mcbride

Notable alumni
 Jean Lovell, All-American Girls Professional Baseball League player
 Mike Palagyi, former MLB player (Washington Senators)

References

External links
 District Website

High schools in Ashtabula County, Ohio
Public high schools in Ohio
High School